Roman Mikulec (born 18 March 1972) is a Slovak politician and former soldier, serving as the current Interior Minister of Slovakia.

Education
In 1994, Mikulec graduated with a Master's degree at the Military Air Force Academy in Košice (today Faculty of Aeronautics of Technical University of Košice). He also holds a M.Sc. in law, economics and management from the Brno International Business School (B.I.B.S.).

Career
After a short time as a fighter pilot, in 1997 Mikulec joined the Military Intelligence Service, eventually becoming its director. He was charged with sabotage, defamation and disclosing classified information in 2013, but was acquitted in 2019.

In 2020 parliamentary election, Mikulec stood for Ordinary People, an anti-corruption party. He received 7435 preferential votes and was elected to the National Council. Mikulec was made Minister for the Interior on 21 March 2020.

See also

Cabinet of Igor Matovič

References

1972 births
Living people
Politicians from Bratislava
Slovak aviators
Interior ministers of Slovakia
OĽaNO politicians
Military personnel from Bratislava